The Kodaikanal–Munnar Road (old SH-18) was located in Dindigul District and Theni District of Tamil Nadu and Idukki district of Kerala in South India. The road was improved by the British in 1942 as an evacuation route in preparation for a possible Japanese invasion of South India. With a maximum  elevation of  just south of Vandaravu Peak, it was among the highest roads in India, south of the Himalayas, prior to its closure in 1990.

History

In 1864 Douglas Hamilton submitted a report stating that the Berijam Swamp area was the best site in the Palani Hills for a military cantonment or sanatorium. "Let but the lake be reconstructed and a road made to it, and this magnificent sheet of water . . . will of itself attract residents to its vicinity. "The Fort Hamilton military outpost, later built there, was named for him.

In 1900 the Kundale Road and Tramway between Munnar and Top Station was completed by the Kanan Devan Hills Produce Company. The  road runs down the valley of the Kundale River. By 1905 the timber bridges were being replaced by steel and concrete structures.

In 1915, Law's Ghat road,  opened Kodaikanal to cars, trucks, and buses coming from Batlagundu. This was an extraordinarily slow dirt road, taking about eleven hours to reach Cochin. The road was impassable during and after heavy rains.

In 1942, during World War II,  Madras City  was bombed by the Japanese but the physical damage was negligible, though the public response was major and the city was evacuated because of fears of subsequent Japanese bombing and invasion. Many rich families from Madras moved permanently to the hill stations in fear, while poor people were evacuated to both nearby and far-flung villages that lay along the railways.
In 1942 in preparation for a possible Japanese invasion of India, the  British began improvements to the road to facilitate its use as an evacuation route from Berijam Lake (Fort Hamilton) near Kodaikanal along the southern crest of the Palani Hills to Top Station. It was then called "The Escape Road".  Existing roads then continued to Munnar and down to Cochin where ships would be available for evacuation out of India. 

A far more probable reason for building this road was to secure the "top station" of a Munnar tea exporting rope-way (at Top Station, then in Madras Presidency) by providing a motorable route from Madras Presidency.

The road was operative till 1990 but was ignored by both the Tamil Nadu Forest Department and the Kerala Highways Department in a dispute over its inter-state ownership. The old road is now in disrepair and overgrown with vegetation in some places. It is used as a logging trail and as a walking trail by local villagers and trekkers. Encounters with wild animals including bison, elephants, Leeches and leopards sometimes occur on the trail.

Old route

The road begins as Club Road at  elevation on the bund at Kodaikanal Lake, climbing west as Upper Shola road and forking left as Pillar Rocks road. It has very good dream Nelly the Green Valley View, (formerly called Suicide Point) at km 5.5, Kodaikanal Golf Club at km 6, Pillar Rocks Viewpoint at km 6.5

and Moir Point at km 9.3. At this point of  elevation the road forks, with the left fork going towards Berijam, and Munnar. 
The right fork is the "Goschen Road" to the villages of Poombarai and Kukkal northwest of this place. Extensions to Mannavanur (junction), and Kavunji, together with a connecting road to Berijam Lake from near Kavunji, create a loop of about  length, the "Forty Mile Round". In 1929, Sir Thomas Moir "turned the first sod", beginning construction of the "Goschen Road" which was completed in 1932.

Just past this junction is a Forest Department checkpost, which controls entry into the Allinagaram Reserve forest through which the road passes west to Berijam Lake and beyond. This area is part of the proposed Palani Hills Wildlife Sanctuary and National Park.
Beyond km marker 13 on the Berijam road there is a firewatching tower from where one may have a fine view of the secluded Berijam Lake and the surrounding forest.
At km 21 at  elevation, Berijam has a Forest Department Camp including an Eco-Education Center for visitors. Nature areas to be visited here include: swamp ecosystem, fresh water ecosystem, nature trail, bridge, medicinal demonstration garden, museum, nature walk, grassland and shola.  This camp also is the site of an old two-story brick building, partly damaged and blackened over the years, with a bright yellow painted name reading "Britisher's Transit Camp". This is one of several transit camps built during World War II for British soldiers to rest along the  British "Escape Route" from Kodaikanal via Top Station and Munnar to Cochin. While most of the transit camps are now either dilapidated or demolished, the one  at Berijam is still used as a Forest Rest house. At this point an old road, now just a trail, forks off to the north for  down to Kavunji village at  elevation.
 
West of Berijam Lake, the road is closed for public vehicles and not maintained.  Though the road is heavily damaged and overgrown till the Kerala border, it is well maintained within Kerala past Top Station.

The road meanders southwest and passes south of Konalar Dam and reservoir at km 25. It then continues southwest and around the south side of a  hill at km 31, then northwest around  Ibex peak and through a shallow  pass at km 34. 1.5 km over a hill past a rest house, it passes down across a bridge over Kathirikkai Odei (the Second Trout Stream). There is a path from there up along the stream to a  waterfall on the stream.  The road then proceeds northwest,  bridges the Pulavachiar river at km 39, makes a loop north and then passes south along the east side of Vandaravu Peak. The road crosses its highest point of  just south of Vandaravu Peak at km 50 where it crosses the Kerala state boundary and enters Pampadum Shola National Park.

The road then proceeds sharply down to the southwest through 17 hairpin turns  to Top Station (Again Tamil Nadu) at elevation  at km 60.  Here the road becomes Kerala SH-18 and is well maintained, passing by extensive tea plantations  to Munnar.  There is public bus service between kodaikanal to kilavarai, vattavada to munnar, the distance between kilavarai and vattavada is 17 km no bus service

Access

The old roads are now overgrown with vegetation and are used only as walking trails by local villagers and trekkers. Encounters with wild animals including bison, leopards, elephants, tigers sometimes occur on these trails.

The Tamil Nadu Forest Department has restricted entry into the Berijam Lake area to between 9.30 a.m. and 3 p.m. for the general public.  An entry permit (free)  is required and can be obtained in person at the Forestry Department Office in Kodaikanal. Only ten permits are given each day, so early application the previous day is advised for timely access to the road west of Muir Point.

Tourists contact: (before 11:30 a.m.) Government of Tamil Nadu, Tourist Office, Annasalai, Kodaikanal 624 101, Tamil Nadu, India. Phone: 04542-241675.

Trekking
Trekkers and researchers must get advance permission from the Tamil Nadu Forest Department and the Kerala Forests and Wildlife Department to travel along the route of the old road. A pamphlet, "Sholas For Survival", available from the District Forest Office, Kodaikanal describes 17 local treks ranging from leisurely walks to challenging day-long treks. This booklet provides a trekking map of the Palani Hills and details the degree of difficulty for each trek.

Rivers
The Kodaikanal–Munnar Road crosses several rivers between Berijam and Top Station. There are no river crossings between Moir point and Berijam. Rivers that are crossed, traveling east to west include:

It has small pool above a  waterfall just south of the road crossing.
This stream originates  SW, just above a  waterfall, in the farthest SW corner of the Palani Hills.
This is below the final climb up to Vunderavu hut. The river flows north, is joined by several tributaries, including the Poondi/Kavunji? stream and flows down the valley between Polur and Kilavarai. Just west of Kumbur, it becomes the major tributary of the Kumbur River which drops  into Manjampatti Valley, passing Mungulpalum village and joining the Ten Ar river at Manjampatti Village.
The road crosses small unnamed tributaries 4 times, north of Pulavachiar crossing.

Most of these stream crossings still have stone and/or concrete bridges.

Shelters
There are several structures on or near the road which may be available for overnight use by trekkers. Proceeding east to west, they are:
The Forest Dept. checkpost at  near Muir Point after Km 9 is not for overnight use but may offer temporary daytime shelter during a rain shower.
Green Hut is an old Forest Dept. bungalow at  near km 14, which has been used for overnight camping since at least 1943. It will be renovated soon.
The Fire lookout tower at  just past km 13,  before Berijam lake, has a roofed hexagon structure not meant for overnight use but can offer short term safety from Gaur and elephants.
Trekkers must get advance permission to stay overnight there. Visitors must bring their own provisions, but cooking facilities are available.

These are shown on the Army map. The bungalow there was fixed up several years ago and equipped with flush toilets and an elephant ditch was built around it. There is a separate kitchen building out back.
Tamil Nadu Forest Dept. built the buildings to house Dept. staff who lived there while supervising wood cutting enterprises and road work crews. The laborers, mostly Sri Lankan Tamils, built temporary shacks of poles and matting. The shacks were abandoned when the cutters moved on to another area. The supervisors' "pucca" huts remain and now provide basic overnight shelter for trekkers. Limited overnight accommodations may be used with advance permission.
This camp shows below a red star on the Army map. There is overnight shelter here for trekkers.
Current condition and suitability for shelter is unknown.
There is a well maintained Kerala Forest quarters at  near the Bandar Wireless Station on the south slope of Vandaravu Peak.
There are limited commercial cabins and hotels at Top Station and many commercial accommodations of all classes at Munnar.

Intersections

There are several well established side roads and other intersecting minor trails which branch off from the Kodaikanal–Munnar Road. Most of these show as "other trails" on the 1959 Army map. The Ciff Trail provides an alternate east-west route between Berijam Lake and the Kerala Forest Bungalow. There are over 40 recognized hiking routes from Kodaikanal using the Munnar road and these other trails.

Excluding Kodaikanal Municipal roads, going from east to west, the intersections are:

Pambar Falls are nearby. Path descends steeply to Dolphins Nose, a dramatic perch over the Pambar valley below. A bridle path leads through Cardamom plantations, sholas and meadows leading to Vellagavi, an isolated old village with paved streets and a Muruga Temple. Footpath proceeds down west side of Vellagaviar River valley. The path becomes a dirt road along the river Vannathi odai. Kumbakarai Falls are at the bottom. Trekking time is 5 hours.
Extensions to Mannavanur (junction), and Kavunji, together with a connecting road to Berijam Lake from near Kavunji, create a loop of about  length, the "Forty Mile Round". In 1929, Sir Thomas Moir "turned the first sod", beginning construction of the "Goschen Road" which was completed in 1932.
 Green Hut-Chinnoor footpath begins at  near km 14 near Green Hut. The path follows the cliff top for  then descends a steep ridge  to Chinoor village.
 Berijam-Periyur-Periyakulam 
This trail continues  down a ridge where it joins the Marion Shola-Bodi trail and continues another  to Bodinayakanur town.
 The Ciff Trail is an old  walking trail providing an alternate east-west route between Berijam Lake and the Kerala Forest Bungalow below Vandaravu Peak on the Munnar Road. This trail closely follows the southernmost edge of the Palani plateau along the top of the rugged escarpment  dropping down to the plains. Beginning at the head of the Berijam-Bodi trail, after , the trail reaches the cliffs and forks off to the west. The trail proceeds  precariously along the edge of a precipice to a small hill. It then proceeds  over the hill to Marion Shola bungalow.
After  along this dramatic cliff, the trail heads  up and over another hill and again skirts the cliff top. The trail then goes  around the north side of a small hill and back along the cliff top to the furthest  southwestern point of the Palani Hills.
 Kavunji Road junction is at  just past Berijam Camp. It is an overgrown road between Berijan Camp and Kavunji village.
 Konalar-Bodi footpath begins at  starts  after Kavunji Junction and joins the Berijam (SW)-Bodi footpath  downhill.
After passing steeply down  through the shola and along a small ridge, the path follows an unnamed stream  to Uttamparai village at  elevation on the plains.
 Kilavarai trail, also at  At about 40th Km from Kodaikkanal, a forest road leads to Kilavarai. Sholas, grasslands, Eucalyptus and wattle plantations alternate. Be cautious around Gaur Vellaiyan a  waterfalls at a picnic spot en route.  Enjoy the high altitude meadows. Trout fish live in the areas streams.
A vehicle road then goes south  to Top Station and north  to Vattavada, another  to Kovilur and  more to Kadaveri.
The path descends  from Top Station to Kotagudi. From Kotagudi a rough and winding road descends  through the foothills along the valley of the Kotagudi River to the level plains where it proceeds smoothly  to Bodinayakanur.

Roadside forests

The upper Palani Hills route of the Kodaikanal Munnar road  is part of the Western Ghats of India.  Some of the very rare and endangered plants and animals of India are found here. including intact relics of primary indigenous vegetation and a large number of non-native plants. The area is one of the 25 biodiversity hotspots of the world.

The road originally passed through an area of frost-tolerant shola/montane grassland mosaic interspersed with pockets of stunted shola forests in the valleys. In 1900, 75% of the  area of the Upper Palni Hills,was grassland. This shola/grasslands ecosystem was effective in conserving monsoon rainfall and letting it soak in to replenish the watertable for year-round release into the streams.

From 1948 through the 1960s the Tamil Nadu Forest Department planted large areas of indigenous grasslands along the road with black wattle for producing tanning agents for use in the leather industry. blue gum (eucalyptus) and Mexican weeping pine were planted in order to provide a reliable alternative firewood supply to protect the native shola forests from cutting for firewood. The 1973 vegetation map shows these imported tree species already taking over the grasslands around the road. A detailed dynamic map of 2002 vegetation shows distribution of various plantation species that have replaced most of the grasslands and native evergreen forests.   Another 2002 map of Palni Hills, showing distribution of wattle plantations, also shows wattle dominating the route of the Kodaikanal Munnar Road. Exotic forests now cover over 80% of the area which was previously covered by Grasslands. These non-native species now dominate thousands of acres once dominated by native grasses.

These extensive wattle plantations are sometimes blamed as the major cause of reduced soil moisture and stream flows across upper Palni catchments, though  it is likely that reduced rainfall during the Southwest monsoon period, combined with a pattern of heavy downpours and longer dry spells between rain events in the non-monsoon months is also responsible. Wattle plantations in the upper Palanis seem to help regrowth of indigenous shola species and associated wildlife, and also reduce cutting of shola forests by providing superior fuel wood. It is probable that these old, non-productive plantations, that are slow-growing or partially invaded with native woody species, are similar to native forest in terms of water use.

New route

Though the old evacuation route is now impassable for vehicles, there remains a desire and need among farmers and tourists for a direct road link between Kodaikanal and Munnar.

The Kadaveri– Kilavarai road is a horse trail used by farmers of Kadavari to take their products to Kodaikanal, via Kilavarai. It is possible but not practical to pass here by off-road vehicle.

This is the least improved section of a new Munnar–Kodaikanal Highway proposed by the Roads and Bridges Development Corporation of Kerala Ltd. This highway would provide a direct road link between the two popular hill stations of Munnar and Kodaikanal. The proposed road connects Vattavada (near Munnar) and Kadavari at the Kerala–Tamil Nadu border. Length of the proposed Vattavada - Kadavari Road is  A  extension of the above road from Kadavari to  Kilavarai in Tamil Nadu is also proposed.

It would provide a reliable link between the unimproved and unconnected rural communities of Vattavada and Kilavarai, improving the living standards of the people. Estimated cost of the project is Rs. 942 Million (2003 estimate). M/s Mecon Limited has completed the feasibility study and submitted the final report.

Gallery

External sources
Travelogues:
 17–18 March 2012 Top Station - Vandaravu watch tower and Top Station - Kurangini trek, Sandeep Unnimadhavan
 11–13 February 2012 Kodaikanal - Berijam - Kavunji - Kilavarai - Vattavada trek, Sandeep Unnimadhavan
 27–29 November 2009 Kodaikanal to Munnar Trek - A Bittersweet Escapade, Poonam Parihar 35 photos
 27 August 2009 Kodaikanal - A different approach, (The New Road) by Shinu
 Chennai Trekking Club –
 1–3 May 2009 Kodai–Munnar Escapade, Ashok Rajasekaran
 1–3 May 2009 Kodaikanal Munnar trek, Aravind GJ,  182 Photos
 2 April 2009 Visit Kodaikanal, Trek Mannavanur to Vandaravu via Berijam-Marian Shola-Kathrikai Odai-
 21–23 March 2008  "Kodai to Munnar" Trek, Peter Van Geit, 231 Photos
 21–23 March 2008 GPS Trak -  Berijam to Munnar segment
 4 October 2009 Kodaikanal to Munnar: Backroads at their best, Sydney Winer
 7 Jan. 2008 Kodai to Munnar - The Art of Getting Lost ..., Lost in the Woods
 May, 2006 Days in the forest Following a forgotten mountain trail in the Western Ghats. Text and photographs by Sanjiv Valsan
 Bangalore Mountaineering Club -
26–29 Jan 2006 Trek from Kodai to Munnar, Pradeep Jayaraman,
 25-26 Dec 2018 Two wheeler ride from Munnar to Topstation, updated roads, Atulpriya Sharma
Photos:

References

Roads in Tamil Nadu
State highways in Tamil Nadu
Scenic roads in India
Wildlife sanctuaries in Tamil Nadu
Tourist attractions in Idukki district
Geography of Idukki district
Mountain passes of Kerala
Mountain passes of the Western Ghats
Roads in Idukki district